Mill Creek is a stream in the town of Edmeston, New York. It converges with Wharton Creek at the hamlet of Edmeston.

References

Rivers of Otsego County, New York
Rivers of New York (state)